Aydlett is an unincorporated community in Currituck County, North Carolina, United States. Aydlett has a post office with ZIP code 27916, which opened on August 10, 1900.

References

Unincorporated communities in Currituck County, North Carolina
Unincorporated communities in North Carolina
Populated coastal places in North Carolina